Amy Juliet Adams (née Milnes; born 19 May 1971) is a former New Zealand politician of the New Zealand National Party and the current chancellor of the University of Canterbury, Christchurch, New Zealand. She was the Member of Parliament for Selwyn from 2008 to 2020, when she retired.

Adams' prior career was as a lawyer. She served as New Zealand's Minister for the Environment, Minister for Communications and Minister of Justice in the Fifth National Government.

Early life and family 
Adams was born in 1971. When she was two, her mother divorced her father, raising her and her sister Belinda alone. Adams attended Rangitoto College on the North Shore of Auckland, where she was friends with Louise Upston (also later a National Party politician), then graduated from the University of Canterbury with a Bachelor of Laws with First-Class Honours. Her first employment as a lawyer was in Invercargill, but she soon moved back to Canterbury. She became a partner in the Christchurch law firm Mortlock McCormack.

Adams married Robert Donald "Don" Adams, with whom she has two children. The couple live in Aylesbury, close to the fault line and epicentre of the 2010 Canterbury earthquake. They also own three farms in Darfield, Kirwee, and Te Kauwhata. The first two of these are sheep and crop farms in Canterbury, and within the area of the Central Plains Water scheme. Through their company Amdon Farms Ltd, the Adams family is a shareholder of Central Plains Water. The Te Kauwhata farm is located in the Waikato.

Adams' sister Belinda later worked in the office of Social Development Minister Paula Bennett and was appointed Families Commissioner in 2013. Adams' brother-in-law, David Ware is a telecommunications executive and publicly criticised Adams' actions while she was Minister for Communications and Information Technology.

Political career

Fifth National Government, 2008–2017
Adams was selected as the National Party candidate for the Selwyn seat for the 2008 general election after a contested selection. She won the seat with a comfortable majority, achieving 60% of the electorate votes cast. This compares with the National Party achieving 55% of party votes. In her first term, she was a member (subsequently deputy chairperson and chairperson) of the Finance and Expenditure Committee, and also chaired the Electoral Legislation Committee that considered legislation to replace the Electoral Finance Act 2007.

In 2009 her Fair Trading (Soliciting on Behalf of Charities) Amendment Bill was drawn from the member's ballot. The bill required fundraising companies to disclose the proportion of funds they passed on to the charities they collect for. The bill passed and became the Fair Trading (Soliciting on Behalf of Charities) Amendment Act 2012.

Adams was made Chairperson of the Finance and Expenditure Committee and the Electoral Legislation Committee for the final months of the 49th Parliament. When the National Party won a second term in Government in 2011, she was appointed to the Cabinet as Minister of Internal Affairs, Minister for Communications and Information Technology, and Associate Minister for Canterbury Earthquake Recovery. After a reshuffle of cabinet responsibilities caused by the resignation of Nick Smith, Adams was made Minister for the Environment. Chris Tremain succeeded her in the Internal Affairs portfolio.

After National won the 2014 general election in September, Adams became the Minister of Justice, Minister for Courts, Minister of Broadcasting and Minister for Communications. Following Bill English's elevation to Prime Minister in 2016, Adams also took on the roles of Minister for Social Housing, Minister Responsible for Social Investment, Minister Responsible for Housing New Zealand and Associate Minister of Finance, in addition to retaining the justice and courts portfolios.

Opposition, 2017–2020
Following the formation of a Labour-led coalition government after the 2017 general election, English resigned as Leader and Adams contested the subsequent leadership election. Simon Bridges was elected, with Adams considered the next closest contestant. She became National's finance spokesperson in Bridges' Shadow Cabinet, ranked third in the caucuse, and served on the Finance and Expenditure and Privileges select committees. On 22 January 2019, Adams was designated as the shadow Attorney General following the retirement of Chris Finlayson.

In June 2019, Adams announced that she would retire from politics at the 2020 general election, and that she would step down from her Shadow Cabinet roles immediately. She was replaced as National's candidate in Selwyn by journalist Nicola Grigg. While a backbencher, Adams was appointed deputy chair of the committee that considered the Abortion Legislation Bill.

After Todd Muller replaced Bridges as National Party leader in a leadership challenge in May 2020, Adams rescinded her retirement and was given the party's COVID-19 Recovery portfolio and a ranking of 3 in Muller's Shadow Cabinet. On 2 July 2020, Adams assumed the drug reform portfolio from former National Party deputy leader Paula Bennett, who announced that she would be retiring at the upcoming election. As Grigg had already replaced Adams as Selwyn candidate, Adams was to have stood as a list-only candidate in the election but, after Muller was replaced in the leadership by Judith Collins in July, Adams reconfirmed her decision to leave politics. She delivered her valedictory statement on 30 July 2020.

Post parliament
On 23 September 2021, Labour Health Minister Andrew Little announced that Adams would be among the first people appointed to the board of Health New Zealand, the new health authority being established to replace New Zealand's District health boards.

Political views
Amy Adams describes herself as "socially liberal, economically conservative." She considers herself a feminist and supported the Abortion Legislation Act 2020. She has defended abortion on the grounds of women's reproductive rights and urged religious opponents of abortion reform to stop teaching that contraception is a sin. Adams has also voted in favour of legalising same-sex marriage and legalising assisted dying for people with terminal illnesses.

As Minister of Justice, she wiped the convictions of men convicted of homosexual acts prior to the decriminalisation of homosexuality in 1986, and apologised on behalf of the Government.

References

External links

Amy Adams MP official site
Profile at National party

|- 

|-

|-

|-

|-

1971 births
Living people
New Zealand National Party MPs
University of Canterbury alumni
21st-century New Zealand lawyers
People educated at Rangitoto College
Members of the Cabinet of New Zealand
New Zealand MPs for South Island electorates
Members of the New Zealand House of Representatives
New Zealand women lawyers
Government ministers of New Zealand
21st-century New Zealand politicians
Women government ministers of New Zealand
Women members of the New Zealand House of Representatives
21st-century New Zealand women politicians
Female interior ministers
Candidates in the 2017 New Zealand general election
Politicians from Auckland
Female justice ministers
Chancellors of the University of Canterbury
Justice ministers of New Zealand